The men's 400 metre freestyle competition at the 2002 Pan Pacific Swimming Championships took place on August 24 at the Yokohama International Swimming Pool.  The last champion was Ian Thorpe of Australia.

This race consisted of eight lengths of the pool, with all eight being in the freestyle stroke.

Records
Prior to this competition, the existing world and Pan Pacific records were as follows:

Results
All times are in minutes and seconds.

Heats
The first round was held on August 24.

Final 
The final was held on August 24.

References

2002 Pan Pacific Swimming Championships